In game theory, an epsilon-equilibrium, or near-Nash equilibrium, is a strategy profile that approximately
satisfies the condition of Nash equilibrium. In a Nash equilibrium, no player has an incentive to change his
behavior. In an approximate Nash equilibrium, this requirement is weakened to allow the possibility that a
player may have a small incentive to do something different. This may still be considered an adequate
solution concept, assuming for example status quo bias. This solution concept may be preferred to Nash
equilibrium due to being easier to compute, or alternatively due to the possibility that in games of more
than 2 players, the probabilities involved in an exact Nash equilibrium need not be rational numbers.

Definition 

There is more than one alternative definition.

The standard definition 

Given a game and a real non-negative parameter , a strategy profile is said to be an
Every Nash Equilibrium is equivalent to an -equilibrium where .

Formally, let 
be an -player game with action sets  for each player  and utility function .
Let  denote the payoff to player  when strategy profile  is played.
A vector of strategies  is an -Nash Equilibrium for  if 
 for all

Well-supported approximate equilibrium 

The following definition
imposes the stronger requirement that a player may only assign positive probability to a pure strategy  if the payoff of  has expected payoff at most  less than the best response payoff.
Let  be the probability that strategy profile  is played.
Let  be the payoff to  when strategy profile  is used.
The requirement can be expressed by the formula

Results 

The existence of a polynomial-time approximation scheme (PTAS) for ε-Nash equilibria is
equivalent to the question of whether there exists one for ε-well-supported
approximate Nash equilibria, but the existence of a PTAS remains an open problem.
For constant values of ε, polynomial-time algorithms for approximate equilibria
are known for lower values of ε than are known for well-supported
approximate equilibria.
For games with payoffs in the range [0,1] and ε=0.3393, ε-Nash equilibria can
be computed in polynomial time
For games with payoffs in the range [0,1] and ε=2/3, ε-well-supported equilibria can
be computed in polynomial time

Example 

The notion of ε-equilibria is important in the theory of 
stochastic games of potentially infinite duration. There are 
simple examples of stochastic games with no Nash equilibrium 
but with an ε-equilibrium for any ε strictly bigger than 0.

Perhaps the simplest such example is the following variant of Matching Pennies, suggested by Everett. Player 1 hides a penny and
Player 2 must guess if it is heads up or tails up. If Player 2 guesses correctly, he
wins the penny from Player 1 and the game ends. If Player 2 incorrectly guesses that the penny 
is heads up,
the game ends with payoff zero to both players. If he incorrectly guesses that it is tails up, the game repeats. If the play continues forever, the payoff to both players is zero.

Given a parameter ε > 0, any strategy profile where Player 2 guesses heads up with
probability ε and tails up with probability 1 − ε (at every stage of the game, and independently
from previous stages) is an ε-equilibrium for the game. The expected payoff of Player 2 in
such a strategy profile is at least 1 − ε. However, it is easy to see that there is no
strategy for Player 2 that can guarantee an expected payoff of exactly 1. Therefore, the game
has no Nash equilibrium.

Another simple example is the finitely repeated prisoner's dilemma for T periods, where the payoff is averaged over the T periods. The only Nash equilibrium of this game is to choose Defect in each period. Now consider the two strategies tit-for-tat and grim trigger. Although neither tit-for-tat nor grim trigger are Nash equilibria for the game, both of them are -equilibria for some positive . The acceptable values of  depend on the payoffs of the constituent game and on the number T of periods.

In economics, the concept of a pure strategy epsilon-equilibrium is used when the mixed-strategy approach is seen as unrealistic. In a pure-strategy epsilon-equilibrium, each player chooses a pure-strategy that is within epsilon of its best pure-strategy. For example, in the Bertrand–Edgeworth model, where no pure-strategy equilibrium exists, a pure-strategy epsilon equilibrium may exist.

References 
Inline citations

Sources
H Dixon Approximate Bertrand Equilibrium in a Replicated Industry, Review of Economic Studies, 54 (1987), pages 47–62.
H. Everett. "Recursive Games". In H.W. Kuhn and A.W. Tucker, editors.  Contributions to the theory of games, vol. III, volume 39 of Annals of Mathematical Studies. Princeton University Press, 1957.
 . An 88-page mathematical introduction; see Section 3.7. Free online at many universities.
R. Radner. Collusive behavior in non-cooperative epsilon equilibria of oligopolies with long but finite lives, Journal of Economic Theory, 22, 121–157, 1980.
 . A comprehensive reference from a computational perspective; see Section 3.4.7. Downloadable free online. 
S.H. Tijs. Nash equilibria for noncooperative n-person games in normal form, SIAM Review, 23, 225–237, 1981.

Game theory equilibrium concepts